The Gentilhombres Grandes de España con ejercicio y servidumbre (Gentlemen of the Bedchamber Grandee of Spain) was a palatial class of honorary royal servants of the Royal Household and Heritage of the Crown of Spain, who were  entrusted with certain functions at the service of the Monarch which they exercised by rigorous seniority.

During the reigns of the last two monarchs before the proclamation of the Second Spanish Republic, King Alfonso XII, and King Alfonso XIII, being symbolically considered as "relatives" to the King, they were always close to his chamber in all kinds of ceremonies and stayed with him inside and outside of  the Palace, having lunch daily with him and being also with him at public spectacles such as the bullfights, the theatre, etc.
They exercised their functions by strict daily shifts.  Nevertheless, they were not employees of the Royal Household like the Mayordomos de semana and did not receive a regular salary for their service.

From the ceremonial point of view - in royal baptisms - seven of them were entrusted to deliver the sacred ornaments for the sacrament (saltcellar, water-jug, cottons, brush etc.). In the Public chapels, they always stayed at the procession that was celebrated right before the Mayordomos de semana. In official banquets and in the annual opening of the Cortes Generales (Spanish Parliament), the Gentilhombre Grande de España in service were always behind the King. With their status, they had free entrance to the Royal Palace of Madrid up to the Chamber after the Saleta and the Antechamber.

To be nominated for this class, it was necessary to not only to belong to the nobility but also to be a Grandee of Spain, and they had to be previously presented to the King in the so-called ceremony of the Cobertura (Coverage).

Their badge was a golden gilded key on a red velvet ribbon with golden bangs and the Royal Cypher of the King who nominated them embroidered also in gold. The key was placed horizontally in the waist to the right side in uniforms, dress-coat or frock coat.

They were styled Excelentísimos señores Gentilhombres Grandes de España con ejercicio y servidumbre.

This Office was suppressed after the Second Spanish Republic was declared on April 14, 1931, and it was never re-created after the restoration of Monarchy in November 1975.

At the moment of the suppression, there remained 213 Gentilhombres Grandes de España con ejercicio y servidumbre at service. Among them, the following ones were the most important:

 The Duke of Baena
 The Marquess of Velada
 The Duke of Lerma
 The Duke of  Arión
 The Count of Almodóvar
 The Duke of Infantado
 The Duke of la Victoria
 The Duke of Alba
 The Duke of Villahermosa
 The Duke of Aliaga
 The Duke of Medinaceli
 The Count of Oropesa
 The Duke of Zaragoza
 The Marquess of Hoyos
 The Marquess of la Cenia
 The Duke of Tarancón
 The Count of Plasencia
 The Count of Montijo
 The Duke of Pinohermoso
 The Marquess of Narros
 The Duke of Tamames
 The Duke of Veragua
 The Duke of San Pedro de Galatino
 The Marquess of Atarfe
 The Marquess of Quirós
 The Marquess of Fontalba
 The Marquess of Távara
 The Count of Torre Arias
 The Marquess of Lierta
 The Duke of Alburquerque
 The Marquess of Bondad Real
 The Marquess of Viesca de la Sierra
 The Duke of Lécera
 The Count of Peñaranda de Bracamonte
 The Count of Campo de Alange
 The Duke of San Fernando de Quiroga
 The Marquess of Canillejas
 The Duke of Santo Mauro
 The Duke of Fernán Núñez
 The Marquess of Cubas
 The Duke of Aveiro
 The Marquess of Sentmenat
 The Marquess of Urquijo
 The Marquess of Vallecerrato
 The Count of Peralada
 The Marquess of Guadalcázar
 The Duke of Medina Sidonia
 The Count of Glimes
 The Duke of Sevilla
 The Marquess of Torneros
 The Count of Mora
 The Count of Güell
 The Duke of Santa Elena
 The Duke of Medina de las Torres
 The Duke of Sanlúcar la Mayor
 The Count of Floridablanca
 The Count of Bilbao
 The Count of Valmaseda
 The Marquess of Gauna
 The Marquess of las Nieves
 The Count of Elda
 The Marquess of Arienzo
 The Marquess of Monreal
 The Duke of Béjar
 The Duke of Almenara Alta
 The Duke of Abrantes
 The Marquess of Aldama
 The Marquess of Viana
 The Marquess of el Vasto
 The Marquess of Valdesevilla
 The Count of Guadiana
 The Marquess of Albudeyte
 The Duke of Francavilla
 The Duke of Maqueda
 The Duke of Santa Cristina
 The Viscount of Valoria
 The Count of los Andes
 The Marquess of Castel Rodrigo
 The Marquess of Estella
 The Baron of Segur
 The Duke of Terranova
 The Marquess of Povar
 The Marquess of Foronda
 The Duke of Rivas
 The Count of Superunda
 The Count of Velle
 The Duke of Bournonville
 The Duke of Grimaldi
 The Marquess of las Torres de la Presa
 The Count of Cheste
 The Duke of Canalejas
 The Duke of Soma
 The Count of Ruiseñada

See also 
 Grandee
 List of current Grandees of Spain
Gentilhombres de cámara con ejercicio
Mayordomo mayor
Caballerizo mayor

Bibliography

Enciclopedia universal ilustrada europeo-americana. Volume 49. Hijos de J. Espasa, Editores.1923

Guia  de España. Sucesores de Ribadeneyra. Madrid. 1930

Royal households
Spanish nobility
Grandees of Spain
Spanish courtiers